Blatnice pod Svatým Antonínkem is a municipality and village in Hodonín District in the South Moravian Region of the Czech Republic. It has about 1,900 inhabitants.

Geography
It lies in the Vizovice Highlands. The Svodnice stream flows through the municipality.

History

The first written mention of Blatnice pod Svatým Antonínkem is from 1046. it was located on a trade route. The first mentions of the local wine production are from the late 13th and early 14th centuries.

Economy
Blatnice pod Svatým Antonínkem is known for its wine production, which has a rich tradition and has its own brand of wine Blatnický Roháč.

Sights
The wine is produced in traditional vineyard buildings of folk architecture – búdy, which are above-ground cellars and presses. The oldest were built at the end of the 16th or at the beginning of the 17th century. The area with búdy is protected by law as a village monument zone.

In the village centre is the Church of Saint Andrew. The current building from 1714–1717 replaced an older church from 1480. The prismatic tower contains a renaissance core from the original church.

The Antonínský hill above the village with the small Chapel of Saint Anthony of Padua is the main pilgrimage site in Moravian Slovakia. The chapel was built in 1688 anc containts two murals painter by Jano Köhler. Part of the pilgrimage complex are Stations of the Cross.

References

External links

Villages in Hodonín District
Moravian Slovakia